William Pryer Monument is a monument that stand in the Malaysian town of Sandakan as a memory of the founder, William Burgess Pryer. It is part of the Sandakan Heritage Trails, a trail which connects all the historic sights in Sandakan.

History 
The monument site changed frequently. In the 1950s, the monument stood on a square that today known as the site for the Sandakan Municipal Council. In early 1960s, the monument was located near a field and later been relocated again when Sandakan North Road was converted into a four-lane road.

Its current location is on the "MPS Square", fronting the Municipal Council building along with other monument such as the Chartered Company Memorial after the transformation of the site, which was a former hockey field.

Description 
The granite fountain is divided into a centre part with memorial inscription, gargoyles and two flanking fountain troughs. The memorial inscription reads:

References 

Buildings and structures in Sandakan
Monuments and memorials in Sabah